Bilia is a commune in the Corse-du-Sud department of France, on the island of Corsica, within its Corsican single territorial collectivity. It is part of the microregion of Bisogène, the south-western part of the Corsican region of Rocca.

Politics and administration 
Jean François Quilichini was mayor of Bilia from 1989 to March 2008, whereupon he was replaced by Michel Tramoni. Both mayors are affiliated to the French Communist Party.

Population 

In 2017, Bilia was home to 46 inhabitants.

See also
Communes of the Corse-du-Sud department

References

Communes of Corse-du-Sud
Corse-du-Sud communes articles needing translation from French Wikipedia